Furfenorex (Frugalan), also known as furfurylmethylamphetamine, is a stimulant drug which was developed in the 1960s and used as an appetite suppressant. It produces methamphetamine as a metabolite, and has been withdrawn from the market due to abuse potential.

References 

Substituted amphetamines
Anorectics
2-Furyl compounds
Norepinephrine-dopamine releasing agents